Gerd Søraa (8 April 1934 – 8 March 2018) was a Norwegian writer and politician for the Liberal People's Party.

She served in the position of deputy representative to the Norwegian Parliament from Sør-Trøndelag for the joint list of the Centre Party, the Christian Democratic Party, the Liberal Party and her own party during the term 1977–1981.

In 1980 she became the first female party leader of the Liberal People's Party, and held this position to 1982.

As a writer she was the editor-in-chief for the newspapers Nidaros and Trønderbladet. She authored two novels and books about local history. Søraa died a month before her 84th birthday, on March 8, 2018, possibly from natural causes.

References

1934 births
2018 deaths
Deputy members of the Storting
Sør-Trøndelag politicians
Liberal People's Party (Norway, 1972) politicians
20th-century Norwegian politicians
Norwegian newspaper editors
Norwegian writers
Women members of the Storting
Women newspaper editors
20th-century Norwegian women politicians